May 1968 is a painting by Joan Miró which he created between 1968 and 1973. It is part of the permanent collection of the Fundació Joan Miró in Barcelona. The painting was inspired by the unrest in France in 1968.

History 
Jacques Dupin spoke of the circumstances under which the artist made this work: 

The paintings of this effervescent period were part of a retrospective exhibition for the seventy-fifth anniversary of the artist, which took place at the Maeght Foundation, the Miró Foundation and Cathedral of Barcelona and Haus der Kunst in Munich.

During this time, Miró's work was booming. The period climaxed in 1973, with a series of paintings carved with knives and burned with gasoline and Chalumu.

Background 

In the spring of 1968 students from the universities of Sorbonne and Nanterre revolted in continuing demonstrations that lasted almost a month and a half. This revolt inspired the workers to strike. It was known as the French May and May 68. Joan Miró sympathized with the movement and made this work, a wall where the vitality and prints are ideal for those events.

Description 
On a white background, the artist made brightly coloured stains in the range typical of this period: blue, red, green, yellow and orange. These patches of colour are crushed by thick coloured black lines. This set is superimposed in the foreground a large black spot. With fingers imagined as the drip lines of black, mimicking the impact of a ball or jet black paint.

Main Exhibitions

References

Further reading 
 
 
 

1973 paintings
Paintings by Joan Miró
Paintings in Barcelona